The second series of China's Got Talent, also known as Head & Shoulders China's Got Talent for sponsor reasons, premiered on MediaCorp Channel U on November 1, 2011.

Auditions

Auditions were held in Shanghai Concert Hall. During the third audition recorded on May 9, Judge Gao Xiaosong was detained by Beijing police on drunk driving charges and was sentenced to six months in jail. Taiwanese music composer Antonio Chen was announced as a replacement temporarily. Audition clips with either Gao or Chen were broadcast respectively.  On November 22, Jerry Huang was announced to be a judge for the rest of this series.

The show was pre-empted on November 29, 2011 due to the live telecast of the 2011 Mnet Asian Music Awards.

Semifinals
The semifinals began on January 3, 2012. The Great Hall of the People in Beijing was the venue for the semifinals. Yang Lan, a very popular Chinese host joins Zhou Libo and Annie Yi as judges.

Rules

A media jury are involved. Basketball star, Yao Ming was invited as a jury member in the first semifinals only. Yao's votes will be added to the media jury's votes for the overall votes. The most votes from the jury's votes will be automatically be in the finals. For second finalist, each of three judges has a chance of giving 10 votes to any one of the 7 remaining contestants. Contestant who gets the most votes advance to the final. For the third finalist, voting is based on best of three.

Italics indicate the second stage where each judges gave 10 points to their favorites. The contestants with the most votes combined with the jury points and judges' points will be the second finalist of the week.

Week 1 (January 3 & 10, 2012)

Week 2 (January 17 & 31, 2012)

Finals (February 5, 2012)

World-renowned and Britain's Got Talent runner up, Susan Boyle perform two songs; "Who I Was Born To Be" and "I Dreamed a Dream" at Shanghai Stadium. Also Britain's Got Talent finalist Razy Gogonea performed his Matrix routine. Popular Mandopop singer Han Geng also performed his song "In A Dream."

Rules

Before the final 6 acts performed one last time, the judges picked two more contestants from the semifinals to the finals for second chance. They were Pang Tak-Ming and Tang Kangmin. Each 8 acts will perform for the judges and the judges will decide who will make it to the next stage. It is based on best of three. The second stage is by text voting by the Chinese public and it will determine the final four. The third stage will determine who is the top 2 and this is picked by the judges. The last stage, 100 selected jury will determine who is the winner. The individual who reaches 51 points will declared winner.

Series 2 Round Summary (Top 16)

References

2011 Chinese television seasons
China's Got Talent
2012 Chinese television seasons